James Argue (26 November 1911 – 11 April 1978) was a Scottish footballer who played as an inside forward. He was born in Glasgow and began his career at junior club St Roch's before joining Birmingham in 1931, where he failed to make any appearances for the first team. He moved to Chelsea in 1933. For Chelsea he scored 35 goals from 125 matches in all competitions, 30 from 118 in the English Football League. He went on to play for Shrewsbury Town. Argue died in 1978 in Lennoxtown, Dunbartonshire.

References

External links

1911 births
1978 deaths
Footballers from Glasgow
Scottish footballers
Association football forwards
St Roch's F.C. players
Birmingham City F.C. players
Chelsea F.C. players
Shrewsbury Town F.C. players
English Football League players
Scottish Junior Football Association players